{{DISPLAYTITLE:B8 polytope}}

In 8-dimensional geometry, there are 256 uniform polytopes with B8 symmetry. There are two regular forms, the 8-orthoplex and 8-cube, with 16 and 256 vertices respectively. The 8-demicube is added with half the symmetry.

They can be visualized as symmetric orthographic projections in Coxeter planes of the B8 Coxeter group, and other subgroups.


Graphs

Symmetric orthographic projections of these 256 polytopes can be made in the B8, B7, B6, B5, B4, B3, B2, A7, A5, A3, Coxeter planes. Ak has [k+1] symmetry, and Bk has [2k] symmetry.

These 256 polytopes are each shown in these 10 symmetry planes, with vertices and edges drawn, and vertices colored by the number of overlapping vertices in each projective position.

References

Notes

8-polytopes